Michael Frederick Voss (born 10 November 1966) is a former South African cricketer. Voss was a left-handed batsman. He was born in Cape Town, Cape Province.

Voss made his first-class debut for Western Province B against Orange Free State in the 1984/85 Castle Bowl. His next first-class appearance didn't come until the 1990/91 Castle Bowl when Western Province B played Eastern Province B. He made six further first-class appearances for Western Province B, the last of which came against Natal B in the 1991/92 President's Cup. In his eight first-class appearances for Western Province B, he scored 542 runs at an average of 33.87, with a high score of 115. This score, which was his only first-class century, came against Northern Transvaal B in 1991.

He also played first-class cricket for the Western Province first team, making his debut for the province against Transvaal in the 1990/91 Currie Cup. He made nine further first-class appearances for the province, the last of which came against Natal in the 1992/93 Castle Cup. In his ten first-class matches for the team, he scored 331 runs at an average of 17.42, with a high score of 56. It was for Western Province that he made his List A debut for against Eastern Province in the 1990/91 Benson and Hedges Series. He made seven further List A appearances for the province, the last of which came against Transvaal in the 1991/92 Benson and Hedges Series. In his eight List A appearances for the province, he scored 141 runs at an average of 17.62, with a high score of 41. In 1991, he played a single List A match in England for Hertfordshire in the NatWest Trophy against Warwickshire. He scored 2 runs in this match, before being dismissed by Paul Smith. Voss didn't feature in any Minor counties fixtures for the county.

References

External links
Michael Voss at ESPNcricinfo
Michael Voss at CricketArchive

1966 births
Living people
Cricketers from Cape Town
South African cricketers
Western Province cricketers
Hertfordshire cricketers
South African cricket coaches